Marco Rossi (born 9 September 1964) is an Italian footballer, professional football manager and former player and teacher at the Italian Coaching Academy. From August 2012 to April 2014 and from February 2015 to June 2017 he was head coach of Budapest Honvéd FC. In 2017 he signed a two-year contract with FC DAC 1904. Since 19 June 2018 he is the manager of the Hungarian national team.

His greatest achievement as a player was winning the Italian Cup with Sampdoria. As a coach, he won the 2016-2017 Hungarian Football League title with Budapest Honvéd FC and celebrated a bronze medal in the 2017-2018 Slovak Football Championship with DAC. After Georges Leekens' dismissal, he became the manager of the Hungarian national team.

Club career

Growing up in the Torino youth academy, with whose Primavera team he won an Italian Cup and a Viareggio Tournament, he made his Serie A debut in the 1983-1984 season in Torino-Ascoli (0-0) on March 18, 1984. He moved on to Campania, where he remained three seasons in Serie C1. In 1987 he moved to Catanzaro, newly promoted to Serie B: the Calabrians, as freshmen, missed promotion to Serie A by one point, and Rossi was a starter in defense.

In 1988 he moved to Brescia, where he played five consecutive championships, gaining promotion to Serie A in 1992. In 1993, after the relegation of the Rondinelle, he moved to Sampdoria for 2.5 billion lire, and remained there for two seasons in the top division; at this juncture he was included in the FIFA 97 video game database with the highest rating in the game, corresponding to 97. When his contract with the Genoese club expired, at the age of 31, he moved abroad, first to Mexico to América, then to Germany to Eintracht Frankfurt.

In 1997 he returned to Italy to end his professional career at Piacenza, with which he won salvation in Serie A in a season conditioned by repeated injuries. He played three seasons in the amateurs, one with Ospitaletto (relegation to Eccellenza due to last place) and two with Salò (in Eccellenza Lombarda).

Managerial career
Initially, he worked for lower Italian teams.

Budapest Honvéd
Then from August 2012 he was appointed as the coach of Budapesti Honvéd FC. In his first season, he took third place with Honvéd in the Nemzeti Bajnokság I. However, he was no longer as successful in the following season, so on 28 April 2014, Rossi resigned from his position.

On 7 February 2015, Rossi was appointed as the coach of the Nemzeti Bajnokság I club Budapest Honvéd FC for the second time in his career.

Although Budapest Honvéd FC was not the most financially stable club of the Nemzeti Bajnokság I, Rossi won the 2016–17 Nemzeti Bajnokság I after securing their trophy against their rival Videoton FC in the last round of the season. The last match was won by Honvéd 1–0 at the Bozsik Stadion, Budapest, Hungary.

After winning the 2016–17 Nemzeti Bajnokság I season with Budapest Honvéd FC, Rossi resigned as the manager of Honvéd by saying that:

Rossi was chosen the best manager of the 2016–17 Nemzeti Bajnokság I season.

Dunajská Streda
In 11 June 2017, it was announced that Rossi would sign for FC DAC 1904, a Slovakian football club, for two years plus an option for one more year. The club is strongly supported by the Hungarian minority in Slovakia. The team plays in the Slovakia First League.

In the final round of the season, DAC beat Ružomberok 4-0 away from home to secure their place on the podium, while Rossi led another team to the Europa League qualifiers after bronze medallist Honvéd.

Hungary national team
On 19 June 2018, Rossi was announced as the new manager of the Hungary national football team. He replaced Georges Leekens. 

In 2018, András Gáll's book about Rossi's years spent with Honvéd entitled Marco Rossi: Olasz meló Magyarországon (Marco Rossi: The Italian Job in Hungary) was published.

He debuted as the new coach of Hungary on 8 September 2018 against Finland in the 2018–19 UEFA Nations League series. In the 2018–19 UEFA Nations League edition, Hungary finished second in their group; thus, they were promoted to the 2020–21 UEFA Nations League B. Hungary could beat Greece at the Ferencváros Stadion on 11 September 2018. However, Hungary lost to Greece 1–0 on 12 October 2018 at the Olympic Stadium (Athens), Greece. In the last two rounds, Hungary beat Estonia 2–0, and Finland 2–0 at home. Since Greece lost to Estonia at home, Hungary finished second in their group and their chances to qualify for the UEFA Euro 2020 remained alive.

In the UEFA Euro 2020 qualifying, Hungary finished fourth in their group. On 21 March 2019, Hungary lost to Slovakia 2–0 at the Anton Malatinský Stadium, Trnava, Slovakia. However, Hungary beat 2018 FIFA World Cup Finalists Croatia on 24 March 2019 at the Ferencváros Stadion 1–0. In June of 2019, Hungary beat Azerbaijan and Wales. However, in the decisive match against Slovakia, Hungary lost again 1–2 at home. On 19 November 2019, Hungary went to Wales to win their last match and qualifiy directly to the Euro 2020. However, Hungary lost 2–0 to Wales. Thanks to the results reached in the 2018–19 UEFA Nations League C, Hungary were given the chance to qualify for their Euro 2020. In the UEFA Euro 2020 qualifying play-offs, Hungary were drawn in Path A along with Bulgaria, Romania, and Iceland. In the first match, Hungary beat Bulgaria 3–1 on 8 October 2020 at the Vasil Levski National Stadium, Sofia, Bulgaria. Since Romania lost to Iceland at the Laugardalsvöllur, Reykjavík, Iceland, Hungary could play at the newly-built Puskás Aréna in Budapest. One day before the national team's decisive Euro 2020 qualifiers play-off match against Iceland, Rossi was tested positive for COVID-19. On 12 November 2020, Hungary qualified for the UEFA Euro 2020 by beating Iceland 2–1 at home. 

In the Euro 2020, Hungary failed to progress from the group stage, yet it impressed with an outstanding performance against three powerhouses Portugal, France and Germany, only losing 0–3 to the Portuguese after eighty minutes and drawing both France and Germany in process.

In the 2020–21 UEFA Nations League B series, Hungary played against Serbia, Russia, and Turkey. Surprisingly, Hungary won their group by beating Turkey twice and Serbia once. Hungary beat Turkey 1–0 at the New Sivas 4 Eylül Stadium, Sivas, Turkey on 3 September 2020. Hungary also beat Serbia at the Red Star Stadium, Belgrade, Serbia on 11 October 2020. On the final match day, Hungary beat Turkey 2–0 at the Puskás Aréna on 18 November 2020.

In the 2022–23 UEFA Nations League series, Rossi's Hungary were drawn in one of the most difficult groups including Italy, England, and Germany. Notwithstanding, Hungary finished second in the group and could beat England twice and Germany once in 2022. Hungary could beat England 1–0 at home in the Puskás Aréna on 4 June 2022. Ten days later, Hungary beat England 4–0 at the Molineux Stadium, Wolverhampton, England. On 23 September 2022, Hungary beat Germany 1–0 at the Red Bull Arena (Leipzig), Leipzig, Germany. In the last round, Hungary could have qualified for the finals; however, they lost to Italy at the Puskás Aréna on 26 September 2022.

On 31 October 2022, a detailed interview with Rossi was published by Nemzeti Sport entitled Success in Hungary has change my life. During the interview, it was also leaked that a film would be created on Marco Rossi coaching the Hungarian national team.

On 8 November 2022, Rossi said that Balázs Dzsudzsák deserves a farewell match so he invited him to the squad against Greece. On 20 November 2022, Hungary beat Greece in a friendly match. The match was also the farewell match of Balázs Dzsudzsák who became the player with the most appearances by giving him the chance to play wearing the national team's shirt.

Managerial statistics

Honours

Player
Sampdoria 
Coppa Italia: 1993–94
Supercoppa Italiana runner-up: 1994

Manager
Budapest Honvéd FC
Nemzeti Bajnokság I: 2016–17

References

External links
Budapest Honvéd FC official website 

1964 births
Living people
Italian footballers
Association football defenders
Torino F.C. players
U.S. Catanzaro 1929 players
Brescia Calcio players
U.C. Sampdoria players
Club América footballers
Eintracht Frankfurt players
Piacenza Calcio 1919 players
Serie A players
Serie B players
Liga MX players
2. Bundesliga players
Italian expatriate footballers
Italian expatriate sportspeople in Mexico
Italian expatriate sportspeople in Germany
Expatriate footballers in Mexico
Expatriate footballers in Germany
Italian football managers
F.C. Lumezzane V.G.Z. A.S.D. managers
Aurora Pro Patria 1919 managers
Spezia Calcio managers
Cavese 1919 managers
Budapest Honvéd FC managers
Hungary national football team managers
UEFA Euro 2020 managers
Italian expatriate football managers
Italian expatriate sportspeople in Hungary
Expatriate football managers in Hungary
FC DAC 1904 Dunajská Streda managers
Expatriate football managers in Slovakia
Italian expatriate sportspeople in Slovakia
Slovak Super Liga managers
Nemzeti Bajnokság I managers